Perry A. Hand was appointed Alabama's 47th Secretary of State in November 1989 and served from 1989 to January 1991. He attempted to run for a full term in 1990, but lost to Billy Joe Camp by over 115,000 votes. He also served as Alabama Highway Director from 1991 to 1993 and served for two terms in the Alabama State Senate.

Currently, Hand is Chairman and CEO of Volkert, Inc., a privately held consulting firm based in Mobile, Alabama.  The company offers engineering, environmental consulting, program management, and construction services.

Hand is an alumnus of the Auburn University where he graduated in 1969 with a B.S. in Civil Engineering.

References

Alabama Republicans
Secretaries of State of Alabama